Harry Jay Gibson (born 25 March 1993) is an English field hockey player, who plays as a goalkeeper for Surbiton and has represented the England and Great Britain national teams.

He was educated at Millfield.

Club career
Gibson plays club hockey in the Men's England Hockey League Premier Division for Surbiton.

He previously played for Loughborough Students and Hampstead & Westminster.

References

External links

1993 births
Living people
English male field hockey players
Male field hockey goalkeepers
2018 Men's Hockey World Cup players
Loughborough Students field hockey players
Hampstead & Westminster Hockey Club players
Surbiton Hockey Club players
Men's England Hockey League players
Sportspeople from Taunton
Commonwealth Games bronze medallists for England
Commonwealth Games medallists in field hockey
Field hockey players at the 2018 Commonwealth Games
Medallists at the 2018 Commonwealth Games